Jessica Moore and Carol Zhao were the defending champions, but Moore decided not to participate this year. Zhao partnered with Erin Routliffe, but lost in the semifinals to Mana Ayukawa and Samantha Murray.

Bianca Andreescu and Charlotte Robillard-Millette won the title, defeating Mana Ayukawa and Samantha Murray 4–6, 6–4, [10–6] in the final.

Seeds

Draw

References
Main Draw

Challenger Banque Nationale de Gatineau
Challenger de Gatineau